= Syrian Center for Policy Research =

Syrian think tank

The Syrian Center for Policy Research (SCPR) (Arabic: المركز السوري لبحوث السياسات) is a non-governmental think tank which carries out research related to issues of public policy in Syria. Based in Damascus until 2016, SCPR was regarded as one of the most reliable local sources for information about the Syrian civil war since it was unaffiliated with any government or opposition group.

== Notable research ==
In 2016, an SCPR study estimated that the number of dead due to the civil war was 470,000 and that as many as two million people had been injured. The study also stated that during the years of the war between 2011 and 2016 over 6 million Syrian refugees tried to escape the violence.

== Strategic objectives ==
According to the SCPR, objectives include helping people in Syria to better initiate and engage in an open, respectful, and informed dialogue on key issues of public policy.
